Prilepin (Russian: Прилепин) is a Russian masculine surname, its feminine counterpart is Prilepina. It may refer to the following notable people:

Svetlana Prilepina, Russian astronomer; the asteroid 6467 Prilepina is named after her
Valentin Prilepin (born 1999), Russian football player
 Zakhar Prilepin (born 1975), Russian writer

Russian-language surnames